Vichien Khaokham (born 28 March 1956) is a Thai politician. He is a Member of Parliament for the Pheu Thai Party and member of United Front for Democracy Against Dictatorship. Vichien Khaokham was born in Ban Phue District, Udon Thani Province. He studied Rajabhat Maha sarakham University.

Vichien began his political career in the 1988 general elections, representing Udon Thani Province and the Thai Nation Party, National Development Party and Social Action Party. In the elections of 2007, He won elections in Udontani MP.

Royal decorations 

 2011 -  Order of the Crown of Thailand

References

External links 

 วิเชียร ขาวขำ
 สมาชิกสภาผู้แทนราษฎร ชุดที่ 23
 ประกาศิต "ทักษิณ" จัดแถวเพื่อไทย

Vichien Khaokham
Living people
1956 births